George Cristian Merloi (born 15 October 1999) is a Romanian professional footballer who plays as a midfielder for Liga I club FC Voluntari.

Career Statistics

Club

Honours
Astra Giurgiu
Cupa României runner-up: 2020–21

FC Voluntari
Cupa României runner-up: 2021–22

References

External links

George Merloi at LPF.ro

1999 births
Living people
Footballers from Bucharest
Romanian footballers
Romania youth international footballers
Romania under-21 international footballers
Association football midfielders
Championnat National 2 players
Stade Rennais F.C. players
Liga I players
LPS HD Clinceni players
FC Astra Giurgiu players
FC Voluntari players